Jamal al-Din Muhammad ibn Muhammad ibn Muhammad ibn Fakhr al-Din al-Razi (died 1379), also written al-Aqsara'i, was a 14th-century Muslim Iranian physician. He became known as Aqsara'i because he moved to Aqsara region of what is now Turkey.
 
He is known for his commentary on the Mujaz, which was an epitome made in the 13th century by Ibn al-Nafis of The Canon of Medicine of Avicenna.

Al-Aqsara'i studied medicine with his father, under whose tutelage he first read the Mujaz. Thereafter he studied The Canon of Medicine itself, as well as the Hawi by Razi and the Complete Book on Medicine by al-Majusi, as well as the medical writings of Najib al-Din al-Samarqandi. He employed these other treatises in his commentary on the Mujaz, and he titled his commentary "The Key to the Mujaz" (Hall al-Mujaz).

He died in 1379.

See also
List of Iranian scientists

References

Further reading
 Carl Brockelmann, Geschichte der arabischen Litteratur, 1st edition, 2 vols. (Leiden: Brill, 1889-1936). Second edition, 2 vols. (Leiden: Brill, 1943–49). Page references will be to those of the first edition, with the 2nd edition page numbers given in parentheses. vol. 1, p. 457 (598)
A. Z. Iskandar, A Catalogue of Arabic Manuscripts on Medicine and Science in the Wellcome Historical Medical Library (London: The Wellcome Historical Medical Library, 1967), pp. 55 and 100–103.
A.Z. Iskandar, A Descriptive List of Arabic Manuscripts on Medicine and Science at the University of California, Los Angeles (Leiden: Brill, 1984), p. 44.

14th-century Iranian physicians
1379 deaths
Year of birth unknown